Teen Titans Go! is a comic book series that was published by DC Comics. It is based on the 2003 animated TV series Teen Titans, which is itself loosely based on the team that starred in the popular 1980s comic The New Teen Titans. The series was written by J. Torres with Todd Nauck and Larry Stucker as the regular illustrators. The series focuses on Robin, Raven, Starfire, Beast Boy, and Cyborg who are the main cast members of the TV series.
Also, the show is circled around other characters from other DC comics.

Style

Most issues were largely self-contained stories, and included a number of characters outside the core group of Robin, Raven, Starfire, Beast Boy, and Cyborg. Given that character licensing restrictions in DC comics are different from those on the show, J. Torres was able to include characters such as Wonder Girl who were not licensed for the TV show. Each issue contained riddles, sight gags, and jokes played out by super deformed characters outside the page margins.

The series was written to appeal to an all-ages audience that included pre-teen children, the primary audience of the TV series. However, regarding the target audience for the comic, J. Torres notes that:

Continuity with the animated series
While the comic's stories stand independently, its issues were done so as not to contradict events established in the animated series' episodes. Often, Teen Titans Go! also referenced episodes of the show, as well as expanding on parts of the series.
 In #5, Raven has a pimple which turns into Trigon due to stress.
 Issues #11 and #12 occur during Terra's time with the group, expanding on a flashback from "Aftershock Part 2."
 In #26 and #40, the issues shows Jinx's time with both HIVE Five teams. Another instance is with Wonder Girl's appearance in the comics.  Her appearance will refer to cameos that she made in Season 5 of the show.
 Terra, or a schoolgirl who looks exactly like her, appears in a cameo in #34; her backstory and that of her brother Geo-Force is explored in #51. She also makes a cameo in #39 as a Roblox  (T costume) and in a joke as the schoolgirl.
 In many issues the writers have placed the goth boy from the dance club that talked with Raven in the episode "Sisters."
 Although in issue # 16 ("Beauty and The Wildebeest") a chibi version of Goth (shown selling Chibi Raven candles from a store named DV8 as a parody of the word deviate) is shown with no eyebrows and long eyelashes on the left eye only (a possible A Clockwork Orange reference).
 Issue #19 as the drummer of Johnny Rancid's band. His official name is never actually stated but he is referred to as Goth by most fans. In issue #19 he wears a shirt with the word "GOTH" printed on it.
 In issue #42 it is revealed that he works in an arcade, where wears a name tag marked "GOTH BOY." It's not clear whether that is his real name, with "Goth" being his first name and "Boy" as his last name, or if it is merely his nickname. In Teen Titans Go!, his design has been changed: he no longer has elongated eyelashes on his left eye like he did in the cartoon; he has regular eyelashes. He also has thick eyebrows as opposed to no eyebrows as seen in the show. He also has thicker hair with hair on the sides and grayish purple eyes.  In issue #42 when Raven's  run loose on the city the purple  which represents love/lust flirts with Goth while he is working at the arcade, embarrassing him in front of the other "cast members."
 Issue #39 takes place after the movie Teen Titans: Trouble in Tokyo where Robin and Starfire have finally admitted their feelings for each other and have finally become a romantic couple.
Also, Torres mentioned in the letter pages of #34 that not all stories would be set in the present time. Some were even placed during season 1. An example of this was the first story in #40, which showed Jinx as part of the HIVE.

Issue guide

Collected editions
The series has been collected in trade paperbacks:

Characters that did not make an appearance in the TV series
Wonder Girl (Donna Troy)
Made a cameo in issue #34 ("The Great Race"); had her first full appearance in #36 ("Troy") where she helps the Titans against Blackfire's plot to sell all the female titans into slavery. She appears with the classic Teen Titans (Robin, Aqualad, Speedy, and Kid Flash) and their chibi-selves dress in their original costumes. She also makes an appearance in #39 ("Stupid Cupid") helping Cupid get his wings and arrows back from Larry, who has stolen them to make various Titans hook up with each other.

Wildfire (Ryand'r)
He made an appearance in issue #46 and was revealed to be the long-lost younger brother of Blackfire and Starfire. He had been sent away from home by his parents to protect him from the Gordanians and to preserve the royal family line. Everyone except Blackfire was heartbroken by this decision to send him away from home, and preserved the big secret to keep him safe. Blackfire was motivated into being a villain by jealousy of her younger siblings because Starfire was the favorite daughter for being prettier and kinder, and Wildfire was next in line for the throne after her father despite his absence. He supposedly returned to visit Starfire on Earth, but in the end he turned out to be Madame Rogue in disguise, it remains unclear how this was set up in the first place. When Starfire learns the truth that her brother hadn't truly returned, she figured that it was Blackfire behind the evil scheme. Starfire was so livid that her big sister would resort to pulling such a cruel stunt just to get rid of her and her friends, she cuts all family and sisterly ties with her and swears to find her little brother one day because "he is the only family she has left". Blackfire then looks down in her prison cell in a seemingly mournful way. It could be that she knows that Wildfire is still out there somewhere in the galaxy and may truly reunite with Starfire one day.

In the original comics, Wildfire is with a group of alien superheroes called the Omega Men. So in theory, he has been with them this whole time fighting against The Citadel as mentioned by Starfire in the Teen Titans origin episode "Go!", as well as other forces of evil across the galaxy. His current whereabouts remain unknown and it also remains unknown as of now if Starfire will reunite with Wildfire someday.

Animal-Vegetable-Mineral Man
Had a cameo appearance in issue #28. The Doom Patrol discuss a battle they (along with a younger Beast Boy) had with Animal-Vegetable-Mineral Man.  He makes a full appearance on page 10, which itself is based on the cover of the My Greatest Adventure comic.

Sarah Simms
Sarah's character in Teen Titans Go! to has appeared in many issues starting with the third issue #3 ("Lame") where she was playing baseball with a group of children who have prosthetic limbs and her group of encouraged Cyborg when he was depressed after a kid called him lame. Cy and Sarah both were very attracted to each other. As the Titans were leaving, she told Cy to call her. Sarah appeared in issue #13 ("What Time Is It, Mr. Wolf") where she was trick-or-treating with Cy and the same group of children though their date was cut short when Cy needed to help control Mr. Wolf.

Sarah appeared in #20 ("Secret Moves") where her date with Cyborg was cut short once again. In #27 ("Love is A Battlefield") she and Jinx fight over Cyborg, but the comic ends with both leaving him due to a confusion when he is possessed by Overload. Sarah returned to Cyborg in #39 ("Stupid Cupid"), where she and Cyborg went on a double date with Starfire and Robin. In #45 she, Beast Boy, and Cyborg supervise the handicapped children on a camping trip that Cyborg agreed to do prior to their break up. In the first part of the story, Beast Boy tells his origin to Sarah and the kids by the campfire. The second part has Cyborg talking to Sarah and tells her about his life before to joining the Titans. Sarah explained that she left him because she thought that he didn't care, due to Cyborg never telling her when he would be out on missions for weeks. Cy says he should have been more considerate and open with her and then tells her his origin. After, he tells her that she saw past his cybernetic parts and understood him and he could relate with her. He also says that they met in another life (a reference to Sarasim in the episode "Cyborg the Barbarian"). He asks her if she'd give him a second chance and she tells him that she'll be attending college soon, and Cyborg promises her he'll keep in touch through cellphone, e-mail, text, or even smoke signals (he calls himself as a walking communication center). Sarah happily agrees to make up, and the two hug. Cy happily tells Sarah that he thinks Robin can get a T-communicator for her. The story ends with them embracing, and Beast Boy teasing them like he did in the issue they met.

Justice League (Cameo)
Teen Titans Go! #45 has Beast Boy relating his origin to some children at camp, though he goes outside the facts a few times, such as claiming to have been in the Justice League.  The members who appear in his fantasy are: Superman, Batman, Wonder Woman, Flash, Green Lantern, Martian Manhunter, Hawkgirl, Supergirl, Captain Atom, Captain Marvel, Green Arrow, Plastic Man, Mary Marvel, Aquaman, Atom, Black Canary and Zatanna.
 Batman narrates Dick Grayson/Robin's origin in Teen Titans Go! #47, though he does not appear until the last page of the story.

Kimiyo Hoshi/Doctor Light
In an attempt at helping Kilowat to return to his home dimension, The Titans end up in a reality which is home to the Teen Tyrants (Their evil counterparts).  They are aided in the fight against The Tyrants by The Brotherhood of Justice (counterparts to The Brotherhood of Evil).  Among The Brotherhood is Kimiyo Hoshi/Doctor Light.

Rose Wilson (as the Ravager)
She comes to Jump City in issue #49 and announces herself as Slade's daughter, intending to claim his possessions and carry on his battle against the Titans. However, they convince her that she can make her own choices in life; she then accepts their invitation to stay with them while she sorts everything out.

Geo-Force
He storms into Jump City in issue #51, looking for his sister Terra. Once the Titans calm him down, they learn of the pair's childhood in Markovia and the experiments that gave them their powers. From a distance, he sees Terra on the Murakami School campus. Satisfied that she appears to be happier than she ever was as a child, he leaves without talking to her.

Robby Reed
This version of the character unknowingly drew his powers from other heroes who were close by.  After discovering the source of his powers, Robby gave up his dial and signed up for Cyborg's New Teen Titan's Training program.  His identities in the issue were:

 Changeling- The powers came from Beast Boy.
 Lagoon Boy- The powers came from Aqualad.
 Jesse Quick- The powers came from Kid Flash.
 Power Boy- The powers came from Wonder Girl.
 The Protector- The powers came from Robin.

Cassie Sandsmark
She appears in #54, styling herself as a replacement for Wonder Girl. Her powers (strength, speed, flying) come from two stolen artifacts, the Gauntlet of Atlas and the Sandals of Hermes. She barges into an athletic tournament on Paradise Island, intending to challenge Wonder Girl one-on-one, but ends up saving her from an assault by Trident instead. At the issue's end, she is offered a chance to join the Titans' training program, once her mother is through punishing her for stealing the artifacts.

Cassie has a brief appearance in #55, catching Cyborg off guard with a surprise attack in what turns out to be a very bad dream.

Teen Tyrants
The villainous group from the anti-Matter universe who parallel the titans are known as the "Young Offenders", they work for the Crime Syndicate of America and are mentioned in JLA #109. Exactly the way the Crime Syndicate of America is the evil version of the Justice League is likewise how the Young Offenders are the evil analogs of the Teen Titans. They make their appearance in issue #48 of Teen Titans Go under the name "The Teen Tyrants" (whether this parallel universe is the Anti-Matter universe, Earth-3 or a different world all together is not made clear). The roster consists of Red Robin (the parallel Earth counterpart of Dick Grayson and not the actual character), Tempest (the parallel Earth counterpart of Aqualad), Arsenal (The parallel Earth counterpart of Speedy), Red Raven (the parallel Earth counterpart of Raven) and Blackfire (the parallel Earth counterpart of Starfire and not the actual character) it is mentioned by Cyborg an evil counterpart to Beast Boy must exist on the parallel earth though never actually makes an onscreen appearance, in the New 52 Grid is the analog to Cyborg. Their costumes are all colored with black and red to show their violent, criminal corrupt nature and willingness to kill. There appearances are similar to their counterparts with a few differences. Red Robin's eyes are red and a red version of his counterparts costume from (albeit with a large grey "R" across his chest), Tempest wears a costume that his counterpart wears much later, has a hook in place of his left hand and has shorter hair, Arsenal' has an "A" on his belt buckle and he has a goatee and Aqualad's hairstyle, Red Raven wears a (obviously) red version of her counterparts costume and has pink hair and Blackfire wears red in place of where Starfire would where purple and has black hair. Unlike the Teen Titans they are loosely partnered and are willing to betray each other for personal gain as Blackfire betrays the rest of her team in the end for the brotherhood of justice (the parallel earth's heroic version of the Brotherhood of Evil); in the Justice League comics they are called brats by the Crime Syndicate possibly hinting at how their partnership is based on selfishness rather than loyalty this is implied in Teen Titans Go when Blackfire is shown to be a double agent.

See also
List of comics based on television programs

References

External links
DC page: TTG2004

Comics based on television series